I'm Hip (Please Don't Tell My Father) is the debut album by American jazz guitarist John Pizzarelli.

Reception

Writing two decades after the album's release, Scott Yanow of AllMusic commented that Pizzarelli "never had a strong voice, but his charm and likable personality usually overcame his vocal shortcomings". He concluded the album was "[a]n interesting early effort."

Track listing

Personnel

Musicians
 John Pizzarelliguitar, vocals
 Bucky Pizzarelliguitar
 Russ Kassoffpiano
 Jerry Brunobass guitar

Production
 Bernard Brightmanexecutive producer
 Gary Poznerengineer
 Bill Farrarliner notes

References

Bibliography

1983 debut albums
John Pizzarelli albums
Albums produced by Bernard Brightman
Stash Records albums